In Greek mythology, Mégês Phyleïdês (Ancient Greek: Μέγης Φυλεΐδης) was the commander of Epeans and/or Dulichians during the Trojan War.

Family 
Meges was the son of Phyleus and his mother's name is variously given as either Eustyoche, Ctimene, Timandra, Hagnete, or Ctesimache.

Mythology 
Meges was one of the suitors of Helen, and commanded the armies of the Echinadians and the Dulichians during the Trojan War, having summoned forty or sixty ships; he also led a contingent of Epeans who had once migrated to Dulichium together with his father.

Meges was credited with killing a number of opponents, including Pedaeus (a son of Antenor), Croesmus, Amphiclus, Itymoneus, Agelaus, Eurymenes, and Deiopites. Dolops attempted to strike him with a spear but the corselet Meges was wearing, a gift for his father from Euphetes of Ephyra, saved his life. Meges helped Odysseus to collect gifts for Achilles. He was one of the men to enter the Trojan Horse.

According to Dictys Cretensis, Meges fell at Troy. Pausanias mentions a painting of him wounded in the arm by a Trojan, Admetes the son of Augeas. Tzetzes relates that Meges, along with Prothous and a number of others, perished at Euboea.

Notes

References 

 Apollodorus, The Library with an English Translation by Sir James George Frazer, F.B.A., F.R.S. in 2 Volumes, Cambridge, MA, Harvard University Press; London, William Heinemann Ltd. 1921. ISBN 0-674-99135-4. Online version at the Perseus Digital Library. Greek text available from the same website.
 Dictys Cretensis, from The Trojan War. The Chronicles of Dictys of Crete and Dares the Phrygian translated by Richard McIlwaine Frazer, Jr. (1931-). Indiana University Press. 1966. Online version at the Topos Text Project.
 Euripides, The Plays of Euripides, translated by E. P. Coleridge. Volume II. London. George Bell and Sons. 1891. Online version at the Perseus Digital Library.
 Euripides, Euripidis Fabulae. vol. 3. Gilbert Murray. Oxford. Clarendon Press, Oxford. 1913. Greek text available at the Perseus Digital Library.
 Gaius Julius Hyginus, Fabulae from The Myths of Hyginus translated and edited by Mary Grant. University of Kansas Publications in Humanistic Studies. Online version at the Topos Text Project.
 Homer, The Iliad with an English Translation by A.T. Murray, Ph.D. in two volumes. Cambridge, MA., Harvard University Press; London, William Heinemann, Ltd. 1924. . Online version at the Perseus Digital Library.
 Homer, Homeri Opera in five volumes. Oxford, Oxford University Press. 1920. . Greek text available at the Perseus Digital Library.
 Pausanias, Description of Greece with an English Translation by W.H.S. Jones, Litt.D., and H.A. Ormerod, M.A., in 4 Volumes. Cambridge, MA, Harvard University Press; London, William Heinemann Ltd. 1918. . Online version at the Perseus Digital Library
Pausanias, Graeciae Descriptio. 3 vols. Leipzig, Teubner. 1903.  Greek text available at the Perseus Digital Library
Quintus Smyrnaeus, The Fall of Troy translated by Way. A. S. Loeb Classical Library Volume 19. London: William Heinemann, 1913. Online version at theio.com
 Quintus Smyrnaeus, The Fall of Troy. Arthur S. Way. London: William Heinemann; New York: G.P. Putnam's Sons. 1913. Greek text available at the Perseus Digital Library.
 Tzetzes, John, Allegories of the Iliad translated by Goldwyn, Adam J. and Kokkini, Dimitra. Dumbarton Oaks Medieval Library, Harvard University Press, 2015. 

Family of Calyce
Achaean Leaders
Ancient Acarnanians

Characters in the Iliad